William Garth may refer to:

William M. Garth (1863–1934), racehorse trainer who won the 1920 Kentucky Derby
William Willis Garth (1828–1912), American politician
William Garth (barrister) (1854–1919), English lawyer, bibliophile